Northeast Normal University (often abbreviated NENU or ) is one of the six national normal universities in the People's Republic of China, located in Changchun, Jilin province. The university was ranked number 37 in the comprehensive ranking of universities in China in 2013, and listed as a Double First Class University and a former project 211 university. It is a Chinese state Double First Class University Plan university identified by the Ministry of Education of China.

History 
Northeast Normal University (NENU) is an institution of higher learning under the direct administration of the Ministry of Education, being selected as one of the universities given priority in construction in the "211 Project". The university, in Changchun city, Jilin province, occupies an area of 1,500,000 square meters, including 800,000 square meters of the main campus and 700,000 square meters of the new campus.

NENU's predecessor is Northeast University, the first comprehensive university founded by the Communist Party in northeast China in Benxi, Liaoning province, in February 1946. In 1949, the school was moved to Changchun City and renamed Northeast Normal University in 1950.

Administration

College and departments 
School of Psychology
Faculty of Education 
School of Politics and Law
School of Economics
School of Business
School of Chinese Language and Literature
School of History and Culture
School of Foreign Languages
School of Music
School of Fine Arts
School of Mathematics and Statistics
School of Computer Science
School of Software
School of Physics
School of Chemistry
School of Life Science
College of Urban and Environmental Science
School of Physical Education
School of Media Science
International Relations Institute and Marxism Research Institute
Institute for the History of Ancient Civilizations (IHAC)

NENU comprises 19 schools, 56 undergraduate specialties and a graduate school, which offers 145 M.A. degree specialties, and 77 Ph.D. degree specialties. There are nine faculties authorized to confer doctoral degrees, 11 disciplines with post-doctoral R&D stations, five key disciplines of the National Institution of Higher Education, six disciplines among the construction projects of the key disciplines of the national "Tenth Five-Year Plan" and the "211 Project" and 18 disciplines among the key subject program of Jilin Province.

Three disciplines are personnel training and scientific research bases of the national fundamental disciplines of arts and sciences; two disciplines are among the key research bases for Humanities and Social Sciences of the Ministry of Education; eight laboratories and research centers are authorized by the ministry. In addition, NENU possesses several national training programs and research institutes such as Preparatory School for Chinese Students to Japan (PSCSJ).

Staff 
There are 1297 full-time teachers, including 354 professors, 429 associate professors and 272 Ph.D. supervisors. There is one academician of the Chinese Academy of Sciences, one academician of the Third World Academy of Sciences and 11 members of the Academic Degree Committee of the State Council. In addition, there are five professors in the "Yangtze River Scholar Program", one recipient of the Ho Leung Ho Lee Prize, four recipients of National Outstanding Youth Fund, five national outstanding young and middle age specialists, three professors selected for the "One Hundred Experts Program" (a national personnel development project organized by the Chinese Academy of Sciences), 25 teachers selected for the personnel construction program sponsored by the Ministry of Education, and two state-level renowned teachers, 14 committee members of the Guiding Committee for Higher Education Instruction and 13 outstanding individuals in education system as well.

Student life 
There are 22,221 full-time students in NENU, including 15,191 undergraduates, 6,599 M.A. and Ph.D. students, and 431 foreign students.

NENU preserves education and teaching as "the foundation of school setting" and has formed a concept of education which is "BE DILIGENT AND CREATIVE IN STUDIES" and "BE EXEMPLARY IN VIRTUE". The quality of students has been continuously improved and for this. The university has enjoyed high prestige in basic education, and received a positive evaluation from the society. NENU was named a "National Advanced Unit for Job-Hunting" by the State Council, becoming one of only four universities to be so named nationally in 2004.

Research and education 
NENU regards scientific research as "the basis of institution strengthening" and places great emphasis on scientific research and has made significant achievements. The natural science research and education was ranked the 18th among all universities in China in 2013.

See also
 Join Network Studio of NENU

References

External links 

 
2013 Ranking of Natural Science Research and Education of Universities in China.

 
Universities and colleges in Changchun
Teachers colleges in China